The Defense Innovation Board is an independent advisory board set up in 2016 to bring the technological innovation and best practice of Silicon Valley to the U.S. Military. It is governed by the Federal Advisory Committee Act (FACA) and provides independent recommendations to the Secretary of Defense. The board consists of experts from across commercial sector, research, and academia.

The Board was founded to bring innovative best practices in technology, workforce, and organizational structure to the Department of Defense.

Joshua Marcuse was the inaugural Executive Director of the Defense Innovation Board. Mr. Marcuse served as Executive Director from August 2016 to March 2020.

Dr. Eric Schmidt was the Board's inaugural Chairman. Dr. Schmidt served as the Board's Chair from August 2016 to September 2020.

The board traveled throughout the world during 2016 seeking innovative ideas from the servicemen involved in military operations to improve processes in use in all theaters of operation.

Organization
The Board advises the Defense Department on key focus areas, such as AI, software, data, digital modernization, and human capital, through its three subcommittees: Science & Technology (S&T); Workforce, Behavior, and Culture (WBC); and Space Advisory Committee (SAC). Meetings are at the call of the Board’s Designated Federal Officer in consultation with the Chair and DoD Chief Management Officer (DoD CMO). Meetings are usually open to the public.

Board members
:
Michael Bloomberg - Chair
Susan M. Gordon
Reid Hoffman
Gilda Barabino
Michael Mullen
Ryan Swann
Mac Thornberry
Will Roper

See also
 DIUx
 MD5 National Security Technology Accelerator

References

External links
 Official website

United States federal boards, commissions, and committees
American advisory organizations